Sevens and Twelves is a compilation of early singles by Fridge, released October 19, 1998.  It compiles all the singles released on Output Recordings, plus a couple of extra tracks.

Track listing
 Anglepoised (15:03) 
 For Force (4:28) 
 Astrozero (6:36) 
 Jessica (4:34)
 Simple Harmonic Motion (5:22)
 Lign (Extended Mix) (0:37)
 It's All On (3:42)
 EH4-800 Phase Shifter (2:24)
 Sequoia (13:01)
 Orko (8:40)
 The Traps (5:53)
 Concert In Your House (2:11)
 Must Be Magic (5:20)
 Asthma (6:53)
 Fisa (3:24)
 Config (6:22) 
 Lojen (4:08)
 Distance (10:42)

References

Fridge (band) albums
1998 compilation albums
Electronica compilation albums